Cina, Cinà or CINA may refer to:

People
Chinas or Chīnaḥ (Sanskrit चीन (cīna)), a people mentioned in ancient Indian literature from the first millennium BC
Kapitan Cina, a high-ranking government position in the civil administration of colonial Indonesia, Malaysia, Singapore, Borneo and the Philippines

Given name
Cina Lawson, Togolese politician
Cina Munch (born 1971), Fijian swimmer
Cina Soul, Ghanaian singer-songwriter and recording artist

Surname
Frederick A. Cina (1908-1984), American lawyer and politician
Jan Cina (born 1988), Czech artist dancer, actor and vocalist of Romani descent
Michele Cinà (born 1956), Italian long-distance runner

Media
CINA Media Group, an owner of Canadian radio stations
CINA (AM), based in Mississauga, Ontario, Canada
CINA-FM, based in Windsor, Ontario, Canada 
CKIN-FM, also known as Radio CINA, based in Montreal, Quebec, Canada

Abbreviations
Canadian Indigenous Nurses Association

Others
Former Buginese lost kingdom of Cina, later absorbed by Luwu
China, also known as Cina, a country in East Asia

See also
Artemisia cina, commonly known as santonica, Levant wormseed, and wormseed, an Asian species of herbaceous perennial in the daisy family
Bukit China, a hillside of historical significance in the capital of Malaysian state of Malacca, Malacca Town
Stenocereus alamosensis, also known as Cina, a species of cactus native to Mexico